The Amazwi South African Museum of Literature, previously the National English Literary Museum (NELM), is a museum that houses archival material relating to South Africa's literary heritage.  It is located in Makhanda (formerly Grahamstown) in the Eastern Cape province of South Africa.

Amazwi's primary functions are to collect and conserve material evidence pertaining to South African literature, to publicise and popularise it, and to provide all sections of the reading public, both locally and abroad, with the means of access to it.  The museum has three principal collections: manuscripts, books and journals, and press clippings. The museum also conducts many outreach programmes (mainly focused on school pupils and university students) aimed at promoting and creating awareness of South Africa's rich literary heritage.

The museum was known as the National English Literary Museum from its founding in 1972 to May 2019.  The museum then formally changed its name to Amazwi South African Museum of Literature at the order of Minister of Culture Nathi Mthethwa, aligned to a new organisational vision of linguistic and cultural inclusivity, and a new mandate to promote and preserve important South African literary works produced not only in English, but across all indigenous languages.

History

The museum was established in 1972. Professor Guy F Butler, the Head of Department of the Rhodes University English Department and himself a poet, became aware of the need for the manuscripts of South African authors to be collected. His collection of his and other writers' material soon became too large for the cupboard he at first housed it in. By an Act of Parliament, NELM was eventually born.

Over the years, NELM has evolved into a national resource, housing a significant amount of literary works. In 1980, NELM was declared a cultural institution, governed by the Cultural Institutions Act (Act 119 of 1998).

Literary Artefacts 
In the 1960s many South African literary manuscripts were ending up in collections in foreign countries. Butler had a vision of a national repository for South African literary manuscripts, and this was the genesis of NELM. The Thomas Pringle Collection for English in Africa was founded in 1972. In 1974 this became the National Documentation Centre for English and in 1980 was declared a cultural institution and renamed the National English Literary Museum and Documentation Centre.

In 2017 the number of literary artefacts in the museum's collection stood at over 100 000. These include authors’ manuscripts, printers’ proofs, diaries, correspondence, publishers’ archives, photographs, posters, play-scripts, theatre programmes and cultural artefacts. The museum's collection of published poems, short stories, novels, plays, autobiographies, travel writing and children's literature exceeds 30 000.

Permanent Exhibition 
‘Voices of the Land’ is the National English Literary Museum's permanent exhibition. The exhibition tells the story of South Africa through the lens of the country's literature, from the earliest writing of the colonial period through to some of the most recent work being produced. The two principal themes are conflict and the environment, and these are woven through the whole of the story. Five of South Africa's national languages are represented, there is a diversity of perspectives and positions, and both written and oral literatures are presented. A selection of significant artifacts from the museum's collections is on display, and there are a number of audiovisual installations.

Satellite Institutions 
Amazwi has two satellite institutions: Schreiner House in Cradock and the Eastern Star Gallery Printing and Press Museum in Makhanda.

Eastern Star 
The Eastern Star newspaper was the forerunner to today's The Star. Established in Grahamstown in 1871, The Eastern Star moved to Johannesburg in 1887 and soon after became The Star. The Argus Group donated the building in which the museum is housed in 1984 and Amazwi restored it from a derelict state.

The Eastern Star Gallery houses exhibits of 19th century printing equipment, and an exhibition that examines the history of the press in South Africa.

The Eastern Star is open by appointment.

Schreiner House 
In 1986 NELM opened its second satellite museum, Schreiner House. South African literary icon Olive Schreiner, best known for her novel The Story of an African Farm, lived in this house with her siblings in the late 1860s. The museum pays homage to Schreiner's work through exhibitions and educational programmes.

The Schreiner House precinct includes the Ikhamanga Hall, built in honour of the Order of Ikhamanga conferred on Schreiner in 2003. The Hall houses an exhibition on the history of Cradock.

South Africa's first green museum

In 2016, NELM moved into a 147 million rand, purpose-built building in Worcester Street, on the outskirts of Grahamstown. A project of the Department of Arts and Culture, it was executed by the Department of Public Works. The building has been certified by the Green Building Council of South Africa as the first five-star Green Star certified project in the category Public & Education Buildings in South Africa. There are numerous display areas as well as humidity-controlled sealed archives. The large 'green' roof over the collections’ storage area enables constant temperature control and substantially reduces electricity consumption. There are exhibition spaces, a small lecture theatre, and an endemic landscaped garden.

References

Literary museums in South Africa
Buildings and structures in Makhanda, Eastern Cape
Museums in the Eastern Cape
1972 establishments in South Africa
Museums established in 1972
Recipients of the Molteno medal